Gerald "Jerry" Buckley (1932 – April 27, 2000) was an American cartoonist who had also worked as an art director and a college professor.

About
Buckley was born in 1932 in the Philadelphia, Pennsylvania neighborhood of Kensington, and attended parochial school at St. William Parish and Northeast Catholic High School, graduating in 1950. He was inducted into that school’s Hall of Fame in 1996, along with Bil Keane. He attended the Philadelphia College of Art, during college, worked part-time at the N. W. Ayer & Son advertising agency in Philadelphia.

Buckley taught at the Philadelphia College of Art, the Philadelphia Art Institute, and the Bucks County Community College.

Buckley worked at the Express Newspapers in Bucks County, Pennsylvania and Mail newspapers of Burlington County, New Jersey. His editorial cartoons appeared in various local newspapers. He received the National Cartoonist Society Advertising and Illustration Award for 1994 and the Reuben Advertising plaque that very same year which was his third nomination in 9 years.

He was married Shirley and lived in Levittown. Buckley died of bacterial pneumonia in Langhorne, Pennsylvania in 2000, at the age of 67.

References

External links
Billy Ireland Cartoon Library & Museum Art Database

American cartoonists
Living people
Artists from Philadelphia
University of the Arts (Philadelphia) alumni
University of the Arts (Philadelphia) faculty
Bucks County, Pennsylvania
1932 births